Microhistory is a genre of history that focuses on small units of research, such as an event, community, individual or a settlement. In its ambition, however, microhistory can be distinguished from a simple case study insofar as microhistory aspires to "[ask] large questions in small places", according to the definition given by Charles Joyner. It is closely associated with social and cultural history.

Origins
Microhistory became popular in Italy in the 1970s. According to Giovanni Levi, one of the pioneers of the approach, it began as a reaction to a perceived crisis in existing historiographical approaches. Carlo Ginzburg, another of microhistory's founders, has written that he first heard the term used around 1977, and soon afterwards began to work with Levi and Simona Cerutti on Microstorie, a series of microhistorical works.

The word "microhistory" dates back to 1959, when the American historian George R. Stewart published Pickett's Charge: A Microhistory of the Final Attack on Gettysburg, July 3, 1863, which tells the story of the final day of the Battle of Gettysburg. Another early use was by the Annales historian Fernand Braudel, for whom the concept had negative connotations, being overly concerned with the history of events. A third early use of the term was in the title of Luis González's 1968 work Pueblo en vilo: Microhistoria de San José de Gracia. González distinguished between microhistory, for him synonymous with local history, and "petite histoire", which is primarily concerned with anecdotes.

Approach
The most distinctive aspect of the microhistorical approach is the small scale of investigations. Microhistorians focus on small units in society, as a reaction to the generalisations made by the social sciences which do not necessarily hold up when tested against these smaller units.
For instance, Ginzburg's 1976 work The Cheese and the Worms – "probably the most popular and widely read work of microhistory" – investigates the life of a single sixteenth-century Italian miller, Menocchio. The individuals microhistorical works are concerned with are frequently those whom Richard M. Tristano describes as "little people", especially those considered heretics.

Carlo Ginzburg has written that a core principle of microhistory is making obstacles in sources, such as lacunae, part of the historical account. Relatedly, Levi has said that the point of view of the researcher becomes part of the account in microhistory. Other notable aspects of microhistory as a historical approach are an interest in the interaction of elite and popular culture, and an interest in the interaction between micro- and macro-levels of history.

See also
 Alltagsgeschichte
 English local history
 History from below
 :Category:Microhistorians
 Macrohistory

Notable microhistorians

Wolfgang Behringer

Simona Cerutti
Alain Corbin
John J. Curry
Robert Darnton
Natalie Zemon Davis
Theo van Deursen
Clifford Geertz
Carlo Ginzburg
Luis González y González
Maurizio Gribaudi
Craig Harline
Cynthia A. Kierner
Mark Kurlansky
Emmanuel Le Roy Ladurie
Giovanni Levi
Sigurður Gylfi Magnússon
Luis Mott
Leslie Peirce
Detlev Peukert
Osvaldo Raggio
Jacques Revel
Guido Ruggiero
David Sabean
Mimi Sheller
Jonathan D. Spence
Alan Taylor
Stella Tillyard
E. P. Thompson
Alfred F. Young
Carolyn Steedman
Laurel Thatcher Ulrich
Robert Bickers
Sue Peabody

References

Bibliography

External links 
Microhistory - The website of the Center for Microhistorical Research at the Reykjavik Academy in Iceland.
"What is Microhistory?", Sigurdur Gylfi Magnusson, chair of the Center for Microhistorical Research
Microhistory Network A group of historians interested in microhistory (2007-)

Fields of history